St. Thomas Church is a historic Episcopal church located at Orange, Virginia, United States. It is a rectangular brick structure measuring 40 feet wide and 105 feet deep. The front facade features a recessed portico with two Doric columns flanked by two Doric pilasters.  Atop the gable roof is a three-stage tower topped by an octagonal cupola. The original church building was built in 1833–1834, and measured approximately 40 feet wide and 65 feet deep. It was built by William B. Philips, a master mason employed by Thomas Jefferson during the construction of the University of Virginia. It was enlarged and improved in 1853, and enlarged again in 1912.  In 1928, the rear addition was raised to a full two stories and a parish hall constructed.  The original church is believed to have been based on the plans by Thomas Jefferson for Christ Church in Charlottesville, Virginia. That church was demolished in 1895.

It was added to the National Register of Historic Places in 1976. It is located in the Orange Commercial Historic District.

References

19th-century Episcopal church buildings
Buildings and structures in Orange County, Virginia
Churches completed in 1834
Episcopal churches in Virginia
Individually listed contributing properties to historic districts on the National Register in Virginia
National Register of Historic Places in Orange County, Virginia
Churches on the National Register of Historic Places in Virginia
Thomas Jefferson buildings